Pubnico is a small French Acadian community located in Yarmouth County, Nova Scotia on Nova Scotia Trunk 3.

History
Pubnico was founded in 1653 by Philippe Mius d'Entremont. It is the oldest Acadian community still inhabited mainly by Acadians; most of today's residents are descendants of the founder.

Geography
Pubnico consists of three sections. There is West Pubnico, whose people are almost all French speaking; Pubnico proper, better known as Pubnico Head, whose people are mostly all English speaking; and East Pubnico, the part where it is believed to have been located the barony, being occupied by English speaking people, and the rest, up to the Shelburne county line, which is occupied mostly by French speaking people.

Home to the first wind farm in Nova Scotia, Pubnico Point Wind Farm has seventeen 1.8 MW Vestas V-80 turbines with a generating capacity of 30.6 MW. Commissioned in 2005 and purchased by NextEra Energy Canada in 2008, the wind farm is one of the largest in generating capacity in the province.

Popular culture

Pubnico is mentioned in C. J. Ramone's song "Carry Me Away". The song tells the story of a sailor who longs to reach Pubnico to meet his beloved.

References

External links
West Pubnico Acadian Museum
Historic Acadian Village of Nova Scotia - Nova Scotia Museum
All things "Pubnico"
Biography of Philippe Mius d'Entremont
Western Counties Regional Library: Official Site
Official tourism website for Yarmouth & Acadian Shores, with information on Pubnico

Communities in Yarmouth County
General Service Areas in Nova Scotia